Berik Mazhituly Imashev (Berık Mäjitūly İmaşev) (born 7 June 1960) is the Security Council Secretary of the Republic of Kazakhstan. He previously served as a Minister of Justice between 2012 and 2016.

Biography
He was born in 1960, in Almaty. In 1982, he graduated from Lomonosov Moscow State University with a degree in law. After graduating, he worked as investigator at the prosecutor’s office of the district, investigator for particularly important cases under the Prosecutor of the Kazakh SSR, prosecutor of the district, Department Head of State Prosecutor’s Office of the Republic of Kazakhstan, First Deputy Prosecutor of Almaty.
From 1994 to 1997 he worked as Deputy Chairman of “Kazkommertsbank”, Deputy Head of State Property Management Committee of the Republic of Kazakhstan, Head of Tax Police Board – Deputy Head of Tax Committee of the Republic of Kazakhstan. From May 1997 to April 1998 he ran a private legal company.
He was an Aide of the President of the Republic of Kazakhstan and Head of the Agency on Small Business Support from 1998 to 1999.
From 1999 to 2000 he served as Deputy Chairman of the Bar of Astana.
He served as Head of the Agency of the Republic of Kazakhstan for Regulation of Natural Monopolies, Protection of Competition and Small Business Support from 2000 to 2001.
He was a President of CJSC “Neftekonsalting” from 2001 to 2003.
From 2003 to 2005 he served as Deputy Security Council Secretary of the Republic of Kazakhstan.
He was a Chairman of JSC “Fund for the Development of Small Business” from May to October 2005.
In October 2005 he was nominated to be Deputy Head of the Administration of the President of Kazakhstan.
In 1990, he was awarded a “Detection and Policy” Prize from Semenov International Fund, and two medals.

Personal
He has three children: a daughter Aida (b. 1984) who is married to the very wealthy Nurali Aliyev who is the son of Rakhat Aliyev and Dariga Nazarbayeva, a son Alzhan (b. 1987), and a daughter Adiya (b. 1999).

References

Living people
1960 births